Nami Urabe (born 29 August 1978) is a Japanese former professional tennis player.

Born in Saitama, Urabe was one of Japan's top players in junior tennis, reaching the girls' doubles final of the 1995 Australian Open with partner Saori Obata. Her best performance on the WTA Tour was a quarterfinal appearance in the doubles draw at the 1995 Japan Open and she won eight doubles titles on the ITF Women's Circuit.

ITF finals

Doubles: 15 (8–7)

References

External links
 
 

1978 births
Living people
Japanese female tennis players
Sportspeople from Saitama (city)
20th-century Japanese women
21st-century Japanese women